Abraham Seidenberg (June 2, 1916 – May 3, 1988) was an American mathematician.

Early life 
Seidenberg was born on June 2, 1916 to Harry and Fannie Seidenberg in Washington D.C. He graduated with a B.A. from the University of Maryland in 1937. He completed his Ph.D. in mathematics from Johns Hopkins University in 1943. His Ph.D. thesis, written under the direction of Oscar Zariski, was on Valuation Ideals in Rings of Polynomials in Two Variables.

Academic career 
Seidenberg became an instructor in mathematics at the University of California, Berkeley in 1945. He reached the rank of full professor in 1958. He retired from Berkeley in 1987.

Contributions 
Seidenberg was known for his research in commutative algebra, algebraic geometry, differential algebra, and the history of mathematics. He published Prime ideals and integral dependence written jointly with Irvin Cohen, which greatly simplified the existing proofs of the going-up and going-down theorems of ideal theory. He also made important contributions to algebraic geometry. In 1950, he published a paper called The hyperplane sections of normal varieties, which has proved fundamental in later advances. In 1968, he wrote Elements of the theory of algebraic curves, a book on algebraic geometry. He published several other important papers.

Personal life 
Seidenberg married Ebe Cagli. She was a writer, and the sister of Yole Cagli, Zariski's wife. Ebe and her family immigrated to the United States from Italy. The couple frequently visited Italy and Seidenberg held a visiting professorship at the University of Milan.

Death 
Seidenberg died on May 3, 1988, in Milan, Italy. At the time of his death, he was in the midst of series of lectures at the University of Milan.

References 
 
 

1916 births
1988 deaths
20th-century American mathematicians
American historians of mathematics
Johns Hopkins University alumni
University of California, Berkeley faculty
20th-century American historians
Mathematicians from Washington, D.C.